The 2011 Colgate Raiders football team represented Colgate University in the 2011 NCAA Division I FCS football season a member of the Patriot League. The Raiders were led by 16th-year head coach Dick Biddle and played their home games at Andy Kerr Stadium. Colgate finished the season 5–6 overall and 2–4 in Patriot League play to tie for fifth place.

Schedule

References

Colgate
Colgate Raiders football seasons
Colgate Raiders football